"Cupid" (also known in Japan as ) is a song by Canadian  recording artist Daniel Powter from his fourth studio album Turn on the Lights (2012). It was released as a digital download on 10 April 2012 as the lead single from the album. The song charted at number 38 on the Billboard Adult Pop Songs chart.

Background
Powter stated the inspiration and meaning for writing the song "Cupid" was when he was walking with his dog in a park one day and saw an elderly couple hugging and dancing with each other. He also added:

I thought to myself: 'Oh my god. That is so amazing.' So I went back home and started writing all of these lyrics about: It doesn't matter if you're yin, doesn't matter if you're the yang. It's just that, the only thing that matters is that you love each other. So Cupid is trying to capture that moment where we're very different but we still love each other.

Formats and track listings
 Digital Download
 Cupid - 3:44

 UK Promo CD
 Cupid - 3:44

Music video
A music video to accompany the release of "Cupid" was first released onto YouTube on 29 May 2012 at a total length of three minutes and fifty-three seconds. The video was directed by Neil Tardio and depicts the story of a couple, a man and a woman, and the stages in the life of their relationship (From the start where they are young adults and playful, to when they have children and at the end when they have a large family). Powter appears singing on the beach, outside their house and also near the end of the video where he 'gives away' the woman at the renewing of her wedding vows with the man. The video ends with the lovers walking on the beach with their many family relatives. The music video was shot in Malibu, California.

Track listing

Christmas Cupid
Powter's single "Cupid" in a Christmas themed version.

Chart performance

Release history

References

2012 singles
Daniel Powter songs
Avex Group singles
2012 songs
Songs written by Kevin Griffin
Songs written by Daniel Powter
Cupid in music